Lawrence Edward Apitz (May 22, 1906 – June 6, 1980) was an American football player, coach of football and basketball, and college athletics administrator. He served as the head football coach at the University of Louisville from 1936 to 1942, compiling a record of 22–29–3. Apitz was also the head basketball coach at the University of the Pacific in Stockton, California from 1933 to 1936 and at Louisville from 1936 to 1940, amassing a career college basketball record of 39–77.

A native of Bessemer, Michigan, Apitz was valedictorian of his high school class of 1924. He attended the University of Chicago, where he played football as an end and ran track. He was a third-team selection to the 1926 All-Big Ten Conference football team. Apitz died at the age of 74, on June 6, 1980, in Wisconsin.

Head coaching record

Football

References

1906 births
1980 deaths
American football ends
Chicago Maroons football coaches
Chicago Maroons football players
Chicago Maroons men's track and field athletes
Louisville Cardinals athletic directors
Louisville Cardinals football coaches
Louisville Cardinals men's basketball coaches
Pacific Tigers football coaches
Pacific Tigers men's basketball coaches
People from Bessemer, Michigan
Coaches of American football from Michigan
Players of American football from Michigan
Basketball coaches from Michigan